The Spender is a 1913 American  silent short romance film directed by Harry Solter and starring Earle Foxe, Florence Lawrence and Matt Moore in the lead roles.

Plot
The lead actress cures a wayward young man of his lavish spending.

Cast
Florence Lawrence
Matt Moore
Earle Foxe
Charles Craig
Jack Newton
Leonora von Ottinger

External links

American black-and-white films
American silent short films
1910s romance films
1913 films
Films directed by Harry Solter
American romance films
1910s American films